Adriana Alvim Burke (née Viola; born 26 December 1968), commonly known as Adriana, is a Brazilian former footballer who played as a forward for the Brazil women's national football team. She was part of the team at the 1991 FIFA Women's World Cup. At club level she played for EC Radar in Brazil.

While playing college soccer for St. John's Red Storm, Adriana set goal (40) and points (91) records which were not broken until 2015 by Rachel Daly. She was inducted into the program's Hall of Fame in 2014.

At the 1991 FIFA Women's World Cup, Adriana started two of three group games as Brazil were eliminated in the first round.

References

1968 births
Living people
Place of birth missing (living people)
Brazilian women's footballers
Women's association football forwards
St. John's Red Storm women's soccer players
EC Radar players
Brazil women's international footballers
1991 FIFA Women's World Cup players
Brazilian expatriate women's footballers
Brazilian expatriate sportspeople in the United States
Expatriate women's soccer players in the United States